Acromial angle is a prominent bony point at the junction of the lateral border of acromion and the spine of scapula.

Additional images

See also
 Acromion
 Spine of scapula

References

External links

Scapula